"Almeno tu nell'universo" is a song written by Bruno Lauzi and Maurizio Fabrizio and recorded by Italian singer Mia Martini, who released it as a single in 1989 and included the track in the album Martini Mia.
The song was performed for the first time by Mia Martini during the Sanremo Music Festival in 1989, where it placed 9th in a field of 24, receiving the Critics Award, which was later entitled to Martini herself. The song later became a commercial success. It was also covered by several artists, including Elisa, Mina, Thelma Houston and Marco Mengoni, becoming a classic of Italian popular music.

In 2005, "Almeno tu nell'universo" was voted the best Sanremo Music Festival song by the readers of the Italian newspaper la Repubblica. The single was certified platinum by the Federation of the Italian Music Industry.

Background

The music of "Almeno tu nell'universo" was composed in 1974 by Italian songwriter Maurizio Fabrizio. During the same year, Bruno Lauzi was asked to write the lyrics for the song, and he completed "Almeno tu nell'universo" in thirty minutes. The authors of the song immediately asked Mia Martini to record the song, but she refused it. However, in 1989 Martini recorded the song for the album Martini Mia, which marked her comeback after several years. The song was also submitted to the artistic committee of the 39th Sanremo Music Festival and, in January 1989, was chosen as one of the 24 entries of the main competition, where it placed ninth, receiving the Critics' Award which was later entitled to Mia Martini herself.

Track listing
7" single – Fonit Cetra SP 1871
 "Almeno tu nell'universo" (Bruno Lauzi, Maurizio Fabrizio) – 5:05
 "Spegni la testa" (Mia Martini) – 4:00

Charts

Certifications

Cover versions
In 1995, Mina decided to include a cover of "Almeno tu nell'universo" in her album Pappa di latte, replacing Domenico Modugno's "Resta cu'mme", which was originally chosen as a track of the album. Mina's cover was the first recorded tribute to Martini, who had died earlier during the same year.

A cover of the song was recorded by Italian singer Elisa in 2003 for the official soundtrack of the movie Remember Me, My Love, directed by Gabriele Muccino. The song was released as a single, and it topped the Italian Singles Chart for two non-consecutive weeks, later becoming the sixth best-selling single of the year in Italy.

In 2009 the song was also covered by Italian X Factor winner Marco Mengoni, who performed it during the 9th live show. Mengoni included a studio recording of the track in his debut extended play, Dove si vola, and a live performance of the song in Re matto live, released in 2010. The studio version of the song peaked at number 22 on the Italian FIMI Singles Chart.

Tiziano Ferro performed the song during the second night of the 70th Sanremo Music Festival, and dedicated his rendition to his husband Victor Allen. Ferro's cover of the song was later recorded and included in the album Accetto miracoli: l'esperienza degli altri, released in November 2020.

References

1989 singles
2003 singles
Mia Martini songs
Elisa (Italian singer) songs
Italian-language songs
Number-one singles in Italy
Sanremo Music Festival songs
1989 songs
Songs written by Maurizio Fabrizio